Palo Verde National Park, is a national park of Costa Rica, part of the Arenal Tempisque Conservation Area, that contains much of the area of the valley of the Tempisque River and covers an area of 45,492 acres in Guanacaste Province, 30 km west of Canas. The surrounding region is mostly tropical dry forests, and the park concentrates on conserving vital floodplain, marshes, limestone ridges, and seasonal pools from the encroachment of civilization which was putting the ecology of the area at risk.

Geography
The park has a ranger station which is open for visitors from 8 am to dusk, and has potable water and restrooms. The Palo Verde Biological Station is on site operated by the Organization for Tropical Studies. A major feature of the park is the density and variety of bird species, a major factor in the creation of the reserve, due in part to its diverse ecology, with 15 topographical zones from evergreen forests to mangrove swamps. Birds spotted regularly in the park include great curassows, scarlet macaws, white ibis, roseate spoonbills, anhingas, jabirus, and wood storks.

During the dry season water is scarce in other parts of the country. Due to this, many birds flock to the park and its river basin. Parajos Island, which is located in the middle of the Tempisque River, is usually a great place to spot birds. This island is the largest nesting site for the black-crowned night-herons in Costa Rica.

The park protects one of the most endangered ecosystems. It is one of the last remaining tropical dry rainforests that once covered most of Central America. Tropical dry rainforests now exist in less than 0.1% of their original size and are considered to be the most endangered ecosystems in the tropics.

History
Palo Verde National Park was declared a wildlife refuge during the 1970s because over 60 species of birds used the laguna, or wetland, as a migratory stop. There were once 35,000 black bellied whistling ducks, 25,000 blue winged teal, and several hundred migrating ducks during the dry season. Later the park was declared a national park and operated under the government agency MINAE (Ministry of Environment, Energy and Telecommunications). In the 1990s, the park was put on the Ramsar list of wetlands of international importance and also on the Montreux Record.

References

External links
 
 Palo Verde National Park at Costa Rica National Parks

National parks of Costa Rica
Protected areas established in 1978
Ramsar sites in Costa Rica
Geography of Guanacaste Province
Tourist attractions in Guanacaste Province
Central American dry forests

sv:Monte Verde